Io sono Murple (I am Murple) is the first studio album by the Italian progressive rock band Murple. It was released in 1974.

It's a concept album based on two long suites divided into six movements each that tell the sad story of the penguin Murple that, to escape the unchanging everyday of his life, decides spontaneously to move away from the herd and from its natural habitat.

Unfortunately, it will not have time to enjoy the wonders of the world that will be captured by humans ("Nessuna scelta" - No Choice) and forced to perform first in a circus ("Tra i fili" - Between the wires), then in the zoo "Antarplastic" where it will end its days embraced in a small plastic iceberg.

Track listing
Side A - Suite 1 - 17:37
Antartide
Metamorfosi
Pathos
Senza un perché
Nessuna scelta
Murple rock

Side B - Suite 2 - 16:37 
Preludio e scherzo
Tra i fili
Variazioni in 6/8
Fratello
Un mondo così
Antarplastic

Notes

1974 debut albums
Concept albums